Mildred Hillary Davis (February 22, 1901August 18, 1969) was an American actress who appeared in fifteen of Harold Lloyd's classic silent comedies and eventually married him.

Early life and career
The daughter of Howard Beckett Davis, she was born in Philadelphia, Pennsylvania, and educated at the Friends School in Philadelphia. After several years spent studying, she traveled to Los Angeles in the hopes of securing a role in a film. After appearing in several small roles, she caught the attention of Hal Roach, who pointed her out to comedian Lloyd. He was looking for a leading lady to replace Bebe Daniels, and cast Davis in his comedy short From Hand to Mouth in 1919. It would be the first of fifteen films they would star in together.

On February 10, 1923, she married Lloyd. After their marriage, Lloyd announced that Davis would not appear in any more motion pictures. After much persuasion on Davis' part, and much grief, she received Lloyd's consent for her return to the screen in Too Many Crooks, which Lloyd produced through his production company.  It was the only acting role she undertook after her marriage.

Personal life and death
She and Lloyd had three children including daughters Peggy and Gloria Lloyd and son, Harold Lloyd Jr. Davis was very active in Beverly Hills and as hostess at the Lloyds' estate, Greenacres, where she particularly enjoyed rose gardening. Her brother was actor Jack Davis of Our Gang, later a prominent Beverly Hills physician.

The couple remained very close for their entire life together. She found comfort in her strong friendships with actresses Marion Davies and Colleen Moore. She also developed a long-lasting friendship with Lloyd's assistant, Roy Brooks, who lived with them at Greenacres for over 40 years.

On August 18, 1969, Davis died in St. John's Hospital in Santa Monica, California.

Filmography

Notes

References

External links

Mildred Davis at Virtual History

1901 births
1969 deaths
Actresses from Philadelphia
American film actresses
American silent film actresses
20th-century American actresses
Burials at Forest Lawn Memorial Park (Glendale)